Wójtowice may refer to the following places in Poland:
Wójtowice, Lower Silesian Voivodeship (south-west Poland)
Wójtowice, Opole Voivodeship (south-west Poland)